Viola Hashe (1926-1977) was a teacher, anti-apartheid activist and trade unionist in South Africa. Hashe was also blind.

Biography 
Hashe was born in 1926 in the Orange Free State. She started working with the trade unions and joined the African National Congress (ANC) in the 1950s. She became a member of the South African Congress of Trade Unions (SACTU) in the mid-1950s. In 1956, she worked on the South African Clothing Workers Union (SACWU) where she became the first woman leader of an all-male South African union. Hashe spoke at the SACTU conference in Durban where she discussed passes for women, since women weren't allowed to hold passes.

Hashe became the first woman to be threatened with deportation under the Urban Areas Act in 1956. She had the counsel of Shulamith Muller, and the order to deport her was rescinded "barely seven hours before the order was to take effect." In 1963, Hashe was banned under the Suppression of Communism Act, 1950 and then "restricted to Roodepoort" until her death in 1977.

Hashe influenced many people who became activists or who were already working as activists. These included Bertha Gxowa, Mabel Balfour, and Mary Moodley. A branch of the African National Congress Youth League is named after Hashe.

See also 

List of people subject to banning orders under apartheid

References

External links 
 Viola Hashe
 Ma Hashe - True Child of Africa

People from Roodepoort
1926 births
Anti-apartheid activists
South African women trade unionists
1977 deaths
South African blind people